John Northmore may refer to:

 John Northmore (judge), 20th century Australian judge
John Northmore (MP) (died 1415/16), merchant and MP for Taunton